Parakode is one of the main junction situated in the outskirts of Adoor in Pathanamthitta District, Kerala state, India. It comes under Adoor Taluk

Politics

Parakode is a part of Pathanamthitta district Panchayat. It comes under Adoor assembly constituency in Pathanamthitta (Lok Sabha constituency). Shri. Chittayam Gopakumar is the current MLA of Adoor. Shri. Anto Antony is the current member of parliament of Pathanamthitta.

Geography

The main part of Parakode is a junction in Kayamkulam-Punalur road. It connects places Pathanapuram, Punalur, etc to Adoor.

Demographics

Malayalam is the native language of Parakode.

Temples
Sri Mulloorkulangara Devi Temple

See also
Arukalickal,
Ezhamkulam,
Pathanamthitta

References

Villages in Pathanamthitta district